Hibbertia mucronata is a species of flowering plant in the family Dilleniaceae and is endemic to the south of Western Australia. It is an erect shrub with hairy branches, crowded, thick, tapering linear leaves ending in a sharp point, and golden yellow flowers with five stamens fused at their bases, all on one side of two densely hairy carpels.

Description
There are five stamens, fused at the base on one side of the two densely hairy carpels that each contain two ovules. Flowering mostly occurs between August and December.

Taxonomy
Hibbertia mucronata was first formally described in 1852 by Nikolai Turczaninow who gave it the name Pleurandra mucronata in Bulletin de la Société Impériale des Naturalistes de Moscou. In 1863 George Bentham changed the name to Hibbertia mucronata in Flora Australiensis. The specific epithet (mucronata) means "mucronate", referring to the leaves.

Distribution and habitat
This species grows in rocky places or in sandy heath or mallee-scrub in the Fitzgerald River National Park and east to Ravensthorpe and Hopetoun in the south of Western Australia.

Conservation status
Hibbertia mucronata is classified as "not threatened" by the Western Australian Government Department of Parks and Wildlife.

See also
List of Hibbertia species

References

mucronata
Flora of Western Australia
Plants described in 1852
Taxa named by Nikolai Turczaninow